The Port of Orșova is one of the largest Romanian river ports, located in the city of Orșova on the Danube River.

References

Ports and harbours of Romania